The Quartet Principles are the set of three requirements laid out by the Quartet on the Middle East for the diplomatic recognition of a Palestinian government. The Quartet is a diplomatic entity that is composed of the United Nations, European Union, Russia, and the United States, and is involved with mediating the Israeli–Palestinian conflict.

Outline
The three principles as outlined by the quartet are as follows:
 A Palestinian state must recognize the state of Israel without prejudging what various grievances or claims are appropriate,
 Abide by previous diplomatic agreements, and
 Renounce violence as a means of achieving goals.

UN Security Council endorsement
In resolution 1850, the UN Security Council endorsed the Quartet Principles as "in preparation for statehood". Former US President George W. Bush personally sponsored the resolution, ostensibly as a parting gift to Israel.

International response
 Israel lauded the UN endorsement, stating that "The Security Council's statement that lasting peace can only be based on mutual recognition, ending terror and incitement and committing to the two-state solution, is an endorsement of core Israeli principles for the peace process."
 Palestinian negotiators called the resolution "encouraging", but noted the lack of clarity within the resolution.

See also
 Road map for peace

References

Israeli–Palestinian peace process
Two-state solution